Imamshah Bawa Dargah (Urdu امام شاہ باوا درگاہ) is famous Muslim sufi Dargah complex in Pirana near Ahmedabad city in India. Pir Imam Shah Bawa founded the Satpanth (true path) faith around 600 years ago. He taught tolerance at the universality of religions until 1931, the complex was a private property belonging to the Saiyeds direct decedents of Imamshah Bawa. There is one old Masjid also existed in the complex.

Interfaith harmony
Imamshah Bawa Dargah attracted devotees from religions other than Islam and   Hinduism too. All 18 communities living in Pirana village, belonging to different castes and religions, are devotees of Imam Shah Bawa.

References

Mosques in Ahmedabad
Monuments of National Importance in Gujarat
Indo-Islamic architecture
Sunni mosques in India